The  Baltimore Colts season was the fifteenth season for the team in the National Football League. They finished the regular season with a record of 11 wins, 1 loss, and 2 ties, the same record in the Western Conference's Coastal division with the Los Angeles Rams, who defeated them in the regular season finale; the two had tied in mid-October. The Colts lost the new tiebreaker (point differential in head-to-head games) and thus did not make the playoffs, which included only the four division winners.

It is also remarkable that the Colts entered the final game undefeated and yet did not qualify for the playoffs.

Personnel

Staff/coaches

Roster

Regular season

Schedule

Game summaries

Week 14

Standings

Awards and honors 
 Johnny Unitas, Bert Bell Award

References

See also 
 History of the Indianapolis Colts
 Indianapolis Colts seasons

Baltimore Colts
1967
Baltimore Colts